Route 607 or Highway 607 may refer to:

Costa Rica
 National Route 607

United States